Lincoln Heights is an American family drama television series about Eddie Sutton, a Mission Vista police officer who moves his family back to his old neighborhood, Lincoln Heights in the city of Los Angeles, California, to start a new life and to help out his old neighborhood. It is a dangerous place to raise a family, and through the many trials the family goes through, they soon learn that settling in is not as easy as it seems. While Officer Sutton struggles to cope with everyday life as a street cop in Los Angeles, his kids try to fit in at their new schools and with their new neighbors.

The show premiered January 8, 2007 on the ABC Family network with 13 episodes ordered for the first season. It was approved for a second season, which premiered September 4, 2007. Vanessa Hudgens' song "Say OK" had been used in a commercial to promote the second season. To promote the third season, the song "Crush" by American Idols seventh season runner-up, David Archuleta was used. To promote season 4, the song "Avalanche" by Marie Digby was used. The show's theme song was written and performed by bassist Stanley Clarke and singer-songwriter Blaire Reinhard. On January 29, 2010, ABC Family announced the cancellation of the series after four seasons.

Series overview

Season 1
LHPD police officer Eddie Sutton moves back to his old neighborhood with his wife, his two daughters and son, but the adjustments and danger they encounter there soon lead him to wonder whether he made the right decision. Eddie becomes concerned for his eldest daughter, Cassie, when she develops strong feelings for Charles, a new student who is white. Sutton's worries for their children increase when their second daughter, Lizzie, is kidnapped. The Suttons decide to reexamine their decision and an unexpected letter throws everything into chaos. Lizzie makes some questionable new friends in school and the Suttons' son, Tay, befriends Johnny, who appears to be in love with Lizzie.

Season 2
Season two started in September 2007. On the first day of school there is a race-riot which starts at Cassie's high school and separates her from Charles. The riot spills onto the streets of Lincoln Heights; from Jenn's nurse clinic, to Eddie's police job, to Lizzie & Tay's middle school. Lizzie, Tay and Tay's best friend, Johnny, lock themselves in the computer lab and later find they can't get out. Eddie and a young kid point their weapons at each other and the kid shoots Eddie in the leg. Lund fires a shot at the kid and hits him in the shoulder. Jenn manages to patch up all the patients, including her husband. Charles reunites with Cassie and Lizzie, Tay and Johnny get freed. Lizzie and Johnny start a relationship. Lizzie visits Boa, her ex-kidnapper and baby-sits his niece who ends up going to Child Services. Lund's new teenage daughter, Sage, starts at Cassie's high school and the two strike up a friendship. Unfortunately, their friendship crumbles when they get pulled over while driving Sage's mother's car.

The police find drugs in the car and Eddie and Lund interrogate their daughters. Sage claims the drugs belong to Cassie, but Cassie refuses to take the fall for it. Tay starts his music career, but he gets into trouble with his parents about it. Cassie & Charles' relationship intensifies, but Cassie wants to know more about Charles' stepfather, who finished his prison sentence and is now back in his mother's life. Eddie notices the tension and tries to help. Jenn quits her job at the hospital and starts working at a local clinic.

Cassie finds a job at the coffee shop and becomes attracted to Luc, the boss of the place and a producer for local R&B artists. Charles becomes jealous and breaks up with her, thinking he is holding her back. Cassie starts a relationship with Luc and Sage starts a relationship with Charles. Tay is introduced to a girl he likes and is also introduced to the world of alcohol and rehab. Eddie's father comes home and starts a relationship with the late Reverend's wife. Eddie's father, Spencer, finds the man who gunned down his wife and Eddie's mother when Eddie was thirteen years old. The murderer was a man who worked with Jenn and was friends with Tay. Spencer seeks revenge. Charles and Sage get into a serious car accident in the end of the season.

Season 3
The third season of Lincoln Heights premiered on Tuesday, September 16, 2008. Eddie and Jenn's relationship becomes stronger as living in the Heights gets harder. Lizzie gets accepted to a new school under a scholarship. Dana tells Eddie that she has a son named Nate. Tay's career of being a singer is working out great, but he ends up getting into trouble because of it. Charles proposes to Cassie, who originally says yes, but then starts to question herself. They both eventually decide to pledge eternal friendship to one another. Sage recovers from her coma and later runs for prom queen which she wins. Charles is voted Prom King. Mac, Charles' stepfather, attempts to kidnap Cassie outside of the prom, but fails when Tay stops him. Lizzie's best friend, Johnny Nightingale is killed by a hit and run driver. His loss causes Lizzie to fall into a depression. Feeling guilty over Johnny's death, she pulls away from Devin Kingston, whose father is the new reverend at the church. Cassie and Charles have sex on the school's stage which is set up for a Romeo and Juliet play. They end up being filmed by someone who was watching. Cassie later worries that she is pregnant, but later finds out it was a false alarm. Lincoln Heights is suddenly hit by a massive earthquake. Nate is trapped under a large beam in the Sutton home. Eddie tries to help him out and questions Nate about the father he never knew in order to distract him from the pain.

Charles' stepfather, Mac is killed during the earthquake when a massive refrigerator falls on him. He is conscious, barely, but Charles refuses to help him. Cassie is scared and uncertain, but Mac dies before they decide to help him. Eddie and Jenn later find out that Nate is Eddie's son. Jenn is devastated by this news and struggles to cope in this difficult situation. Many homes are damaged by the earthquake and fires have broken out all over Lincoln Heights, including the Sutton home. They gather what they can and leave as quickly as possible. Cassie asks Charles to get her sketch book out of the attic where he discovers a hole in the wall with $100,000. So he puts it in his bag and grabs the sketch book running out of the house. In the end of the season, it shows the family and Charles looking at the house, not saying a word about the money.

Season 4
The fourth and final season of Lincoln Heights premiered on Monday September 14, 2009   with 10 new episodes. The season starts with Charles and Cassie being charged for the murder of Charles' stepfather. There was not enough evidence, so the case was closed. But immediately afterward, the police check both Charles' and Cassie's homes for the stolen money that Charles has, but the money is safely stashed. Lizzie finds trouble when she is encouraged to join a community club. She starts rumors about a schoolmate and then apologizes and quits the club. Meanwhile, Charles discovers he received a letter from his father fifteen years ago, which his mother kept from him.

After obtaining his father's phone number, the two talk and decide to meet. Charles asks Cassie to go with him, but her parents forbid her. She ignores them and instead sneaks out to join Charles and the spend the night with him. Cassie leaves the following morning to face her angry parents, but Charles decides to stay in order to get to know his family. Lizzie makes friends with a Mexican boy while at a community recreation center. He gets very attached to Lizzie and agrees to let Lizzie take his special bear home to fix after another boy, who picks on him, tears it. While walking home alone, Lizzie gets attacked by a man who is after the teddy bear because of the drugs concealed in it.

Cassie finds out that Charles has kept yet another secret from her, which causes him to lose Cassie's trust. To cope with the pain, she decides to go to a popular club with Sage, Sage's boyfriend and Serge, who likes Cassie. While at the club, Cassie goes to the bathroom only to find Serge waiting for her. He tries to touch her, but she kicks him in the crotch. Meanwhile, Lizzie leaves the Outreach dance early after Andrew tries to kiss her during a song which brings back memories of Johnny. The next day, she seeks Andrew out to apologize for leaving early and to explain why. They end up sharing a kiss. The next episode starts out with a surprise visit from Grandpa, who develops a serious crush on the female pastor. He is devastated when he finds out she is engaged to former pastor, Deacon Jones.

Lizzie invites Andrew to meet her family, including her grandfather, who does not appear to be pleased with her new boyfriend. Later on, Cassie and Charles's relationship could be getting weaker. Charles's brother, Travis, visits where they get into serious trouble. Lizzie furthers her deep relationship with Andrew by including him in family activities. During a game called "Name That Bible Verse", things start to get a little out of hand. Deacon Jones accuses Lizzie of cheating and Grandpa embarrasses Lizzie by reacting aggressively. However, Eddie manages to calm things down before they get violent.

The next day, Lizzie and Andrew are having a private moment on the staircase when Grandpa's crush appears at the door. He apologizes for "flying off the handle" the previous night. She explains that she and Deacon Jones broke up because she feels like she was with the wrong man. Grandpa and the pastor share a passionate kiss, watched by Andrew and Lizzie. Tay meets his idol, Trey Songz, and gets to sing along on stage with him. At the very end of the episode, Jen is rushed to the hospital at the cause of a sudden illness. While Jen is in the hospital trying to recover, Cassie tries to decide where the future will lead her and Charles. It is revealed later, as Jen is making a full recovery, that the virus came from the site of the torn down crack house, and not from the clinic as was feared, so the clinic stays open.

Towards the end of the season, Charles decides to join the Army and Cassie considers attending Pratt, a prestigious fine arts/design school in New York City.  However, before making their decisions, Cassie and Charles decide to get married and the Sutton and Antoni families race to the ceremony. Just before the ceremony at the courthouse, the mystery of the $100,000 gets solved. It turns out the money was a payoff of an old murder due to a racist prank committed by Eddie's chief when he was a child. A former inmate on parole, Sid Glass, claims the money and gives half to the Sutton family because of their generous help and effort to support her.

Tay writes a hit song dedicated to Nate Ray called "Fight for You." Nate Ray later sees Tay performing his song on a television news story and tells Jen that he sent the song to his army buddies and it went viral. In the end, Cassie and Charles don't end up getting married, but have an engagement party where their loved ones offer them blessings for a potential wedding in the future. Cassie's father attends with Charles' parents. Charles decides against going into the army and instead accepts his father's offer to pay for him to attend a good college.

Cast and characters

Main

 Edward "Eddie" Sutton (Russell Hornsby) is a police officer who moves his family back to his old neighborhood hoping to make a difference. However, they are soon overwhelmed as one bad incident after another takes place. Despite all of this, Eddie strives to change the lives of the people around him for the better. It's revealed that his mother was killed twenty years ago when he was thirteen, making him thirty-three at the series debut. The age of his oldest daughter implies he and Jenn were teen parents, which is supported later on when it's learned Jenn was about Cassie's age when she married Eddie. This would've made him even younger when his oldest, Nate, with his old flame, Dana Taylor, was born.
 Jennifer "Jenn" Sutton (Nicki Micheaux) is Eddie's wife who is a nurse. She is the daughter of a judge and she is against the family's current location. Despite her own concerns on this, she stays with her husband and puts her medical skills to good use. She married Eddie and had Cassie while still a teenager, which is mentioned later after Cassie thinks about settling down with Charles. At first, Jenn does not like Dana, but they eventually become friends.
 Cassandra "Cassie" Sutton (Erica Hubbard) is Eddie and Jenn's oldest daughter, named after Eddie's mother. She is very determined, kind, sweet, and artistic. Her personality is similar to her father, Eddie. She is very naive to certain things since moving to Lincoln Heights but she is shown to be very feisty and tough when needed to, as shown in Season 2 when she uses her karate skills to help save an older woman from being robbed and to defend herself. She becomes romantically involved with a boy at her school named Charles and later becomes friends with the daughter of her father's partner, Sage. She starts not to trust Charles after the earthquake/Mac's death, fighting with people who are racists. She goes with Charles to meet his father after these events. Cassie and Eddie don't get along after that. After Charles tells Cassie about the money he took, she stops talking to Charles, but eventually forgives him. She wants to go to Pratt Institute, a prestigious college in New York, but doesn't want to leave Charles. They consider getting married, but ultimately change their minds because they wanted their parents to be there. However, they stay engaged, and a wedding is foreshadowed in the future.
 Elizabeth "Lizzie" Sutton (Rhyon Nicole Brown) is Eddie and Jenn's youngest daughter and second-oldest child. Lizzie is smart, outspoken, and witty. She and Cassie are both shown to be firm in standing up for causes they think are important. She enjoys playing basketball, singing and dancing. Later in Season 1, she is kidnapped by two thugs, but one helps her escape. She strikes up an unapproved friendship with him, which later gets her into trouble when she ends up baby-sitting for his teen sister who has a child. Lizzie is later accepted into a private school. She grieves over the death of her friend Johnny, who is killed after a hit and run. When she enters high school, she becomes friends with a boy named Andrew while working at an after-school volunteer program. Andrew kisses her at the program's dance, but she is timid to the fact that she still can't stop thinking about Johnny. Later, she comes face to face with the fact Johnny is gone but will still always be in her heart. She and Andrew finally start a relationship in the end of the series.
 Taylor "Tay" Sutton (Mishon Ratliff) is the youngest child and Eddie and Jenn's only son together. He has type I diabetes type and has a strong passion for music. He is initially shy, but begins to open up as the series progresses, and his talent is shown more towards others. He is seen to be sympathetic towards people and forgives for mistakes, especially towards Ruben, the man who shot Eddie's mother Cassandra to death. Tay is named after the surname of the family that took Eddie in when his mother died. Tay gets a record deal after being shown singing in public on TV.
 Kevin Lund (Michael Reilly Burke) (Seasons 1-3) is Eddie's partner and father of Sage. Kevin and Eddie are very good friends; they help each other through tough times, like when Kevin drinks when things go wrong in his life, just like Eddie's father. During the start of the fourth season it is revealed that he left Lincoln Heights to heal due to the earthquake that happened at the end of season 3.
 Charles Antoni (Robert Adamson) is a boy who is new to the neighborhood. He takes an interest in Cassie. He loves her art and tries to support her in it. Their relationship is "tried" many times in season two. In season 3, they finally realize they were meant for each other no matter the struggles. Charles has numerous troubles with the law. He leaves his stepfather to die and takes money from the Suttons during the earthquake. On the run from the cops, Charles visits his biological father, but when his father rejects him, he returns home and gives the money back to the Suttons. He considers joining the army to pay for college, and he and Cassie decide to get married. They ultimately change their minds, and Charles decides not to join the army. Charles's parents reunite as do he and Cassie.

Recurring 

 Nathaniel "Nate" Ray Taylor (Chadwick Boseman) is Eddie's son with former flame Dana Taylor. Nate was raised down in the south by neither Eddie nor Dana. He served in Iraq in the Army. Eddie did not know Nate was his son until the season three finale. His age and the age of his parents implies they were very young when he was born, considering Eddie was already a teenager when Cassie was born. Season 4, he lives with the Suttons and does not get along with Tay. Nate goes back to Iraq, but he's seriously injured during the war. He suffers from Post-Traumatic Stress Disorder.
 Sage Marika Lund (Alice Greczyn) is Kevin's teenage daughter. She and Cassie are friends, but their friendship eventually deteriorates. Sage makes a move on Charles, but he rejects her. At the end of season two, she and Charles are in a car accident, and she winds up in a coma. She wakes up in season three, and she and Cassie rebuild their friendship. Sage also forms a friendship with Cassie's younger sister Lizzie. She is elected prom queen in junior year. She is last seen at Cassie and Charles's engagement party.
 Spencer Sutton (Michael Warren) is Eddie's alcoholic father who cannot seem to stay out of trouble in Lincoln Heights. Twenty years ago he made a choice to stand up against gangsters which ultimately led to the death of his wife. Whenever he ends up in jail, Eddie constantly bails him out. He starts a relationship with the late Reverend Hammond's wife.
 Becky (Jennette McCurdy) is Lizzie's friend in season 1.
 Mama Taylor (Juanita Jennings) is the woman who helped raise Eddie after his mother was killed by gangsters twenty years ago.
 Dana Taylor (Tammy Townsend) is Mama Taylor's daughter and Eddie's first love. In season 1, she works as a prostitute. Dana and Jen do not get along, but try to be civil to each other. Her son Jeron becomes friends with Tay, which irritates Jen. Dana bonds with Cassie, who turns to Dana for advice about sex. In the season 3 finale, Eddie learns that he and Dana have a child together (Nate). Dana and Jen become friends when Nate is seriously injured in Iraq.
 Jeron Taylor  (Myzel Robinson) is Dana's youngest son, and younger half-brother of Nate.
 Coleman and Beverly Bradshaw (Richard Roundtree and Beverly Todd) are Jenn's parents. Coleman is a wealthy judge who sometimes clashes with Eddie and his father. In season 2, he reveals he has cancer, which strains his marriage. In season 4, he allows Jenn and her family to move in with him, but later reconsiders. Beverly is Jenn's mother who resents Jenn for getting to live her dream as a nurse.
 Ruben (Darrin Dewitt Henson) is a worker at the hospital Jenn works at and Tay's friend. He killed Eddie's mother. In season 2, he takes a bullet for Tay, but survives. In season 3, Tay asks Ruben to help him with his singing career. After testifying against the man who ordered the hit on Cassandra Sutton, Eddie's mother, he leaves Lincoln Heights, telling Tay that everything he needs to make it is in his heart.
 Cassandra Sutton is Eddie's mother. Eddie told the kids she was killed in an accident, however, they soon learn that she was actually killed by a group of gang members with Ruben being the shooter.
 Johnny Nightingale (Gus Hoffman) is Tay's best friend throughout seasons one through three. He becomes Lizzie's boyfriend for ten episodes. He is very in love with her, and eventually Lizzie returns the feeling. They stay together until another boy, Devin, steps in. He dies in season three episode six in a hit and run car accident.
 Marla Antoni (Julie St. Claire) is Charles's mother. In season 1 episode 13, she catches Charles and Cassie about to have sex on her couch and later tells Eddie to control his daughter. In season 2, Marla fights with Charles and Cassie before finally breaking down when she realizes that her ex-husband is a sex offender who made a pass at Charles. After the car accident, Marla vows to be a better mother to Charles, but leaves town in season 3, leaving Charles to fend for himself. She reunites with Charles's father, and tries to get Charles to move with her to Hawaii, but he refuses.
 Andrew Ortega (Tyler Posey) Andrew is Lizzie's first love. Their deep relationship starts out when Lizzie volunteers at the local Outreach center. The actual dating relationship starts at the Outreach dance when Andrew tries to kiss her. She really likes him, but the memories of Johnny Nightingale are too much for her.
 Vera Bradshaw (Bahni Turpin) Vera is Jenn's sister, and the aunt of Cassie, Lizzie and Tay. She is shown to be more free-spirited and spontaneous than Jen. She often states that she was popular throughout high school because of her fun personality and good looks. She is stalked by a man named David in Season 1, but the situation is eventually solved, and he is arrested for stalking. She is shown to be extremely caring for her nieces and nephew, especially shown when Lizzie was kidnapped.
 Detective Briggs (Scott Atkinson) appears in two episodes of Season 1

Home media
On February 16, 2010, Shout! Factory released the complete first season of Lincoln Heights on DVD in Region 1.

References

 Review: The New York Times review by Virginia Heffernan

External links
 

2007 American television series debuts
2009 American television series endings
2000s American teen drama television series
ABC Family original programming
English-language television shows
Television series about families
Television shows set in Los Angeles
Television series by Disney–ABC Domestic Television